Auzaar is a 1997 Indian Hindi-language action thriller film directed by Sohail Khan and written by Anwar Khan. The film stars Salman Khan, Sanjay Kapoor and Shilpa Shetty.

Plot

Suraj (Salman khan), who is a police officer, discovers that Yash's (Sanjay Kapoor), father (Paresh Rawal), runs an illegal business. He must now convince Yash to make his father mend his ways or face criticism from his superiors for not confronting him.

Cast
Sanjay Kapoor as Yash Thakur, Prathna's husband.
Salman Khan as CBI officer Suraj Prakash
Shilpa Shetty as Prathna Thakur, Yash's wife.
Nirmal Pandey as Baba the main antagonist.
Johnny Lever as Peter
Kiran Kumar as Bhaiji
Aashif Sheikh as Inspector Bhudev
Paresh Rawal as Mr. Thakur, Yash's father. 
Ila Arun as herself in song "Apni To Ek Hi Life"
Vishwajeet Pradhan as Baba's Associate
Arun Bakshi as Arun Bhai
Achyut Potdar
Vikas Anand as Doctor
Tiku Talsania as College professor
Mukesh Rawal as Thakur's Associate
Dinesh Hingoo as Qawwal Singer in song "Apni To Ek Hi Life"
Joginder Shelly as Truck driver in song "Apni To Ek Hi Life"
Sulabha Arya

Production
Sohail Khan initially wanted Aamir Khan for Sanjay Kapoor's role, but he declined it for unknown reasons. Then Sohail Khan approached Sunil Shetty for the role, but he was a busy in shooting of another movie . Raveena Tandon was offered the female lead, but declined. Then Shilpa Shetty received the role.

Soundtrack

The film's soundtrack album was composed by Anu Malik. 

The song "I Love You, I Love You" was reportedly plagiarized from Pakistani Qawwali singer Nusrat Fateh Ali Khan's "Allah Hoo, Allah Hoo". Khan was reportedly aggrieved when Malik turned his spiritual "Allah Hoo, Allah Hoo" into "I Love You, I Love You". Khan said "He has taken my devotional song Allahu and converted it into I love you. He should at least respect my religious songs."

References

External links
 
 Planet Bollywood review
 Bollywood Hungama article

1997 films
1997 action thriller films
1990s Hindi-language films
Films scored by Anu Malik
Indian action thriller films